Pedro Barreiros Cardoso de Sousa (born 27 May 1988) is a Portuguese professional tennis player who competes on the ATP Tour. In February 2019, he achieved a career-high singles ranking of world No. 99.

ATP career finals

Singles: 1 (1 runner-up)

Challenger and Futures finals

Singles: 35 (17 titles, 18 runner-ups)

Doubles: 12 (5 titles, 7 runner-ups)

ITF Junior Circuit

Singles: 3 (3 titles)

Performance timelines

Singles
Current through the 2021 US Open.

Doubles

Record against top 10 players 
Sousa's match record against players who have been ranked in the top 10. Only ATP Tour main draw and Davis Cup matches are considered.

 Gilles Simon 1–0
 Juan Martín del Potro 0–1
 David Goffin 0–1
 Ernests Gulbis 0–1
 Fernando Verdasco 0–1
 Stan Wawrinka 0–1

* .

Career earnings

* As of 10 April 2017.

National participation

Davis Cup (9 wins, 3 losses)
Sousa debuted for the Portugal Davis Cup team in 2006 and has played 12 matches in 11 ties. His singles record is 8–3 and his doubles record is 1–0 (9–3 overall).

   indicates the result of the Davis Cup match followed by the score, date, place of event, the zonal classification and its phase, and the court surface.

References

External links
 
 
 

1988 births
Living people
Portuguese male tennis players
Sportspeople from Lisbon
Tennis players at the 2020 Summer Olympics
Olympic tennis players of Portugal
21st-century Portuguese people